Bresje(Jagodina) is a village in the municipality of Jagodina, Serbia. According to the 2002 census, the village has a population of 656 people.

The village is located on the banks of Lugomir, a tributary of the Velika Morava.

Demography

References

Populated places in Pomoravlje District